Diego Armando Valentin Contento (born 1 May 1990) is a German former professional footballer who played as a left-back.

Personal life
Contento's family is from the outskirts of Naples (his father from Casalnuovo di Napoli and his mother from Caivano), Italy, and he was named after former S.S.C. Napoli star Diego Armando Maradona. His older brothers Vincenzo and Domenico were previously in Bayern's youth team.

Club career

Contento played for Bayern Munich's first-team in pre-season friendlies in 2009, appearing against Austrian Bundesliga champion Red Bull Salzburg as a second-half substitute for Edson Braafheid, and was named on the substitutes' bench for a Bundesliga match against Mainz 05 in August 2009. He was called up to Bayern Munich's squad for the 2009–10 UEFA Champions League, where he was assigned the number 26. In January 2010, it was announced that Contento would train with the first-team for the rest of the 2009–10 season, along with reserve team-mates David Alaba and Mehmet Ekici.

Contento signed his first professional contract with Bayern Munich on 13 January 2010. The trio were named on the first-team substitutes' bench for the first time on 10 February 2010, for a DFB-Pokal game against Greuther Fürth, and Contento came on in the 59th minute, replacing Anatoliy Tymoshchuk. Contento made his UEFA Champions League debut a week later, coming on as a half time substitute for Daniel Van Buyten in a game against Fiorentina, and the following weekend he made his league debut in the Bavarian Derby against 1. FC Nürnberg, starting in place of the injured Van Buyten.

He was in the starting XI for the next two games against Hamburger SV and 1. FC Köln, but was injured in the latter, and replaced by fellow youth team graduate David Alaba. On 21 April 2010 he was named in the starting line-up for Bayern's UEFA Champions League semi-final first leg against Lyon. On 27 May 2010, Contento signed a contract extension keeping him at the Allianz Arena until 2013.

Contento started in the 2010 German Super Cup and played the full 90 minutes. Bayern defeated Schalke 04 2–0. Contento began the 2010–11 season as a starter for Bayern. After five games, he suffered an injury and was sidelined for three weeks. He was unable to reclaim his starting spot until the very end of the season. He was first choice to Andries Jonker, the caretaker manager of Bayern Munich until the end of the 2010–11 league season. On 1 July 2011, Jupp Heynckes was named head coach of Bayern Munich. At the beginning of the new Bundesliga season, Heynckes brought in Rafinha for the right back position. Team captain Philipp Lahm changed back to his favoured left side and Contento was mostly relegated to the bench. However, he was in the starting XI in the 2012 UEFA Champions League Final against Chelsea.

On 12 August 2014, Contento signed four-year deal with Ligue 1 side, Girondins de Bordeaux. He had been at Bayern for 19 years.

On 22 May 2018, Contento inked a two-year deal with Fortuna Düsseldorf returning him to the Bundesliga after a four-year spell in France. Contento suffered a cruciate ligament tear in September 2018. During his time with Düsseldorf, Contento only managed to appear in one cup game.

On 1 July 2020, Contento signed with 2. Bundesliga side SV Sandhausen.

Contento announced his retirement from playing in March 2023.

International career
Contento represented Germany at under-17 and under-20 level. In 2010, he expressed his desire to represent Italy rather than Germany at senior level. Contento was called up to the Germany under-21 in September 2010, though he could not make his debut due to an irritation on a toe.

Career statistics

Honours
Bayern Munich
Bundesliga: 2009–10, 2012–13, 2013–14
DFB-Pokal: 2009–10, 2012–13, 2013–14
DFB-Supercup: 2010, 2012
UEFA Champions League: 2012–13; runner-up: 2009–10, 2011–12
UEFA Super Cup: 2013
FIFA Club World Cup: 2013

References

External links
 
 

1990 births
Living people
People of Campanian descent
Footballers from Munich
German footballers
Association football fullbacks
FC Bayern Munich II players
FC Bayern Munich footballers
FC Girondins de Bordeaux players
Fortuna Düsseldorf players
SV Sandhausen players
Bundesliga players
Ligue 1 players
3. Liga players
Regionalliga players
2. Bundesliga players
German expatriate footballers
Expatriate footballers in France
German people of Italian descent
Germany youth international footballers
UEFA Champions League winning players